Justice for Journalists Foundation is a non-governmental organization whose mission is to fight impunity for attacks against media. Based in London, its main goal is to protect journalists from the abuse of their right to freedom of expression, increase public awareness about attacks on media workers and provide journalists with the knowledge and skills necessary to protect themselves from professional risks.

The Foundation collaborates with international NGOs, journalists, educational and research organizations. Among the partners of Justice for Journalists are Reporters Without Borders, the Foreign Policy Centre, Article 19, Charter 97 and Rory Peck Trust.

Activities 
The Foundation's activities consist of four main areas, as stated on its website. 

 Grants for investigating violent crimes against media workers.
 Media Risk Map: monitoring and analysis of attacks on media workers in 12 post-Soviet countries (excluding the Baltic states).
 The Orkhan Dzhemal Media Safety Academy, Russian-language safety training for professional journalists, citizen journalists, and bloggers.
 Raising public awareness about the realities of media work worldwide via visual and print materials, as well as conferences, roundtables, and seminars.

Investigative Grants 

Every year, the Justice for Journalists Foundation awards grants to professional and independent journalists, as well as NGOs, to investigate violent crimes against journalists and media workers. The grant program is open to journalists from around the world.

In 2019, thanks to the support from the Foundation's grant program, the Kyiv Post media outlet published a special project called Dying for Truth, a series of investigative articles about violence against journalists in Ukraine.

In 2019, the Foundation has supported two investigations into the murder of Maltese investigative journalist Daphne Caruana Galizia — the book Murder on the Malta Express: Who Killed Daphne Caruana Galizia? by Manuel Delia, Carlo Bonini, and John Sweeny and the comprehensive joint report titled Justice delayed: the assassination of Daphne Caruana Galizia and Malta's deteriorating press freedom climate by Reporters Without Borders and independent Maltese outlet The Shift News. The book Murder on the Malta Express: Who Killed Daphne Caruana Galizia? won the National Book Council award for Literary non-fiction in Maltese and English.

In September 2020, the Foundation supported the investigation into the murder of journalist Pavel Sheremet by the independent media outlet Zaborona.

In 2020, the Justice for Journalists Foundation contributed some funds towards exploring of how SLAPP is used to halt media workers' investigative efforts. One of the grant recipients, the Foreign Policy Centre, published two Unsafe for Scrutiny reports. As part of its work under the Unsafe for Scrutiny project, the Foreign Policy Centre, along with 21 other organizations, including the Justice for Journalists Foundation, has published a joint policy paper on countering legal intimidation and SLAPP in the UK. The policy paper briefly outlines the common hallmarks of legal intimidation and SLAPPs in the UK context, as well as five key principles for mitigating this threat, with a view to it forming a starting point for legislative and regulatory initiatives to address this issue in the UK.

In 2020, the Foundation supported the investigation into the murder of Somali journalists that has been quoted by various media outlets. After the release of the investigation, Somalia's federal authorities said they would open a full probe into the criminals and officials suspected to have committed crimes against journalists including dozens of murder cases of journalists in the Horn of African country since 1992.

In 2020, the Foundation supported monitoring of court cases involving media outlets and journalists in Armenia that has been conducted by Committee to Protect Freedom of Expression. Findings of the report were used by the United States Department of State in the report on human right practices in Armenia.

In 2021, the Foundation has supported four-part series investigation into the unresolved killing of three Nigerian journalists having been on assignments between 2019 and 2020. Nigerian investigative journalist Patrick Egwu looked into these murders, those behind them, and the growing calls for justice by families of victims and press freedom groups.

Media Risk Map 

The Media Risk Map project is a daily monitoring and categorization of attacks on journalists, bloggers and media workers. It currently monitors attacks in 12 post-Soviet countries (excluding the Baltic states). Data on attacks are available from 2017 to the present day in Russian and English. 

The Foundation published reports on attacks against journalists, bloggers and media workers in Armenia, Azerbaijan, Belarus, Georgia, Kazakhstan, Kyrgyzstan, Moldova, Russia, Tajikistan, Turkmenistan, Uzbekistan and Ukraine for 2017-2020. The reports were cited by various media outlets, such as Novaya Gazeta, RTVI, Deutsche Welle, and Meduza.

In May 2019, the Justice for Journalists Foundation prepared a project with the NGO Index on Censorship to monitor attacks and media rights violations related to the COVID-19 pandemic.

As part of the Risk Map project, the Justice for Journalists Foundation has been regularly monitoring attacks against journalists and bloggers in Central Asia.

The Orkhan Dzhemal Media Safety Academy 

Recently, the Foundation launched the online Media Safety Academy, named after military journalist Orkhan Dzhemal, who was killed in CAR in 2018. The Academy offers free courses for Russian-speaking professional and citizen journalists, freelancers, and bloggers. The Academy features five core modules developed by 14 experts from nine countries.

Trouble with the Truth podcast by Lana Estemirova 

On July 15, 2020, the Foundation began working with journalist Lana Estemirova, daughter of Chechen human rights activist Natalya Estemirova, murdered in 2009. Lana produces a weekly podcast, Trouble with the Truth, in which she interviews independent journalists from around the world and discusses the threats and risks specific to media workers in their regions.

Events 

On a constant basis, the Justice for Journalists Foundation participates in sessions of the United Nations Human Rights Committee. Also, the information about Georgia was incorporated in the concluding observations on the fifth periodic report on Georgia released by the Office of the High Commissioner for Human Rights (OHCHR) on July 27. 

On January 31, 2021, the Justice for Journalists Foundation became partner to the Council of Europe’s Platform to promote the protection of journalism and safety of journalists. The Director of the Justice for Journalists Foundation, Maria Ordzhonikidze, signed the agreement to join the Platform with the Council of Europe Secretary General, Marija Pejčinović Burić.

On March 18, Channel 4 commissioned a documentary Nazanin by filmmaker and journalist Darius Bazargan. The film supported by the Justice for Journalists Foundation grant gives exclusive access into one of the biggest international news stories and follows the life of Nazanin Zaghari-Ratcliffe’s husband Richard and his family as he campaigned to bring his wife Nazanin home from detention in Iran. 

On April 15, 2021, the Justice for Journalists Foundation Director Maria Ordzhonikidze participated in the annual #UNCOVERED conference of the Investigative Journalism for Europe (IJ4EU) programme. Ms. Ordzhonikidze participated on the panel SLAPPs: A Legal Threat to Cross-Border Journalism along Flutura Kusari (Legal Advisor at the European Centre for Press and Media Freedom), Viola von Cramon (Member of the Media Working Group at the European Parliament) and Per Agerman (Stockholm-based freelance journalist, writer for Realtid.se).

On November 2, 2021, to mark the International Day to End Impunity for Crimes against Journalists, the Justice for Journalists Foundation and the Foreign Policy Centre organized a webinar «Media freedom in Malta. Murder, Disinformation and Legal Intimidation».

On November 22-23, 2021, the Justice for Journalists Foundation and the Foreign Policy Centre organized UK's first Anti-SLAPP Conference. This two-day conference brought together over 40 experts from 20 countries from across the globe to delve into SLAPPs and examine the impact it has on journalists, media freedom and wider society.

References

External links

Safety of Journalists - Hansard - UK Parliament
Retreating Rights - Kazakhstan: Introduction - KIAR. Kazakhstan Initiative on Asset Recovery

Journalism